381ECSS is an expeditionary combat support squadron of the RAAF formed at RAAF Williamtown, NSW in May 1998. It is a fully deployable airbase operations unit that provides airbase-specific operations support and common 'close' combat support functions to one or more collocated flying units at a forward operating base. Effectively an ECSS runs the base support to ensure lodger flying units are able to concentrate on the projection of the required air power to support directed RAAF missions.

To date 381ECSS has assisted in Operations Warden/Stabilize (East Timor), Gold (Sydney Olympics), Relex (bare base activation to support maritime interdiction operations), Gaberdine (Immigration Support), Guardian (CHOGM Support), Slipper (Global War on Terrorism), Bastille and Falconer (Iraq War). These activities have included defence aid to the civilian community, activation of bare bases, support to the UN peacekeeping missions, support to border protection, coalition force activities in the Fight Against Terrorism and the War in Iraq.

381ECSS airbase operations and combat support functions include:
Airbase operations
Air traffic control (supported by 44 Wing)
Airfield Rescue and Fire Fighting (ARFF)
Security, Policing and Investigative services
Ground defence
Explosive ordnance disposal operations

Administration
Pay
Personnel support
Travel management
Finance
Welfare support
Postal operations

Logistics
Supply
Warehousing
Transport
Movements
Air Terminal Services (supported by 1AOSS),
Fuel operations
Catering

Airfield Engineering
Civil Maintenance and Engineering
Mechanical Maintenance and Engineering

Health Support (supported by HSW)
Airfield Emergency Response
Medical
Dental
Environmental Health
Physical Training

Communications
Base Radio Maintenance
Base Communications Centre
Information Systems

381ECSS's in-garrison role is to provide specialist military airbase operations at Williamtown in concert with other airbase service providers such as Defence Support Group and Joint Logistics Command. At its 'home' base 381ECSS does not provide all base support services, but when deployed it has the capability (see above) to support a bare base, a greenfield airfield or to augment operations on an existing main base as required, providing all the services to make it a fully operational base.

References

381